Below is the list of castles in Poland in alphabetical order, based on similar lists compiled by various sight-seeing societies.

B 
 Babice (Lipowiec Castle) Lesser Poland Voivodeship
 Baligród Castle – Subcarpathian Voivodeship
 Baranów Sandomierski Castle – Subcarpathian Voivodeship
 Barciany Castle – Warmian-Masurian Voivodeship
 Barczewko Castle – Warmian-Masurian Voivodeship
 Bardo – Lower Silesian Voivodeship
 Bąkowiec Castle – Silesian Voivodeship
 Bełżyce Castle – Lublin Voivodeship
 Besiekiery Castle – Łódź Voivodeship
 Bezławki – Warmian-Masurian Voivodeship
 Będzin Castle – Silesian Voivodeship
 Biała Prudnicka Castle – Opole Voivodeship
 Białoboki Castle – Subcarpathian Voivodeship
 Biały Bór Castle – West Pomeranian Voivodeship
 Biecz Castle – Lesser Poland Voivodeship
 Bielsko-Biała Castle – Silesian Voivodeship
 Bircza – Subcarpathian Voivodeship
 Biskupiec Castle – Warmian-Masurian Voivodeship
 Biskupin Castle – Kuyavian-Pomeranian Voivodeship
 Bobolice Castle – Silesian Voivodeship
 Bobrowniki Castle – Kuyavian-Pomeranian Voivodeship
 Bochotnica Castle – Lublin Voivodeship
 Bodzentyn Castle – Świętokrzyskie Voivodeship
 Bolcz Castle – Lower Silesian Voivodeship
 Bolesławiec Castle – Lower Silesian Voivodeship
 Bolków Castle – Lower Silesian Voivodeship
 Borysławice Zamkowe – Greater Poland Voivodeship
 Braniewo Castle – Warmian-Masurian Voivodeship
 Bratian – Warmian-Masurian Voivodeship
 Breń Castle – Lesser Poland Voivodeship
 Brodnica Castle – Kuyavian-Pomeranian Voivodeship
 Broniszów Castle – Lubusz Voivodeship
Brzeg Castle – Opole Voivodeship
 Bugaj – Greater Poland Voivodeship
 Bychawa Castle – Lublin Voivodeship
 Bydgoszcz – Kuyavian-Pomeranian Voivodeship
 Bydlin Castle
 Bytów Castle – Pomeranian Voivodeship

C 
 Chałupki Castle – Silesian Voivodeship
 Chełm Castle – Lublin Voivodeship
 Chęciny Castle – Świętokrzyskie Voivodeship
 Chlewiska Castle – Masovian Voivodeship
 Chobienia Castle – Lower Silesian Voivodeship
 Chocianowiec Castle – Lower Silesian Voivodeship
 Chojnik Castle – Lower Silesian Voivodeship
 Chojnów Castle – Lower Silesian Voivodeship
 Chrzelice Castle – Opole Voivodeship
 Chudów Castle – Silesian Voivodeship
 Ciechanów Castle 
 Ciepłowody Castle – Lower Silesian Voivodeship
 Cisy Castle – Lower Silesian Voivodeship
 Copice Palace
 Czarny Bór Castle – Lower Silesian Voivodeship
 Czchów Castle – Lesser Poland Voivodeship
 Czechów – Lubusz Voivodeship
 Czernina Dolna Castle – Lower Silesian Voivodeship
 Częstochowa Castle – Silesian Voivodeship
 Czernica Castle – Lower Silesian Voivodeship
 Czersk Castle – Masovian Voivodeship
 Człuchów Castle – Pomeranian Voivodeship
 Czocha Castle – Lower Silesian Voivodeship
 Czorsztyn Castle – Lesser Poland Voivodeship
 Czudec Castle – Subcarpathian Voivodeship
 Czyżów Szlachecki Castle – Świętokrzyskie Voivodeship

Ć 
 Ćmielów Castle – Świętokrzyskie Voivodeship

D 
 Darłowo Castle – West Pomeranian Voivodeship
 Dąbrowa Tarnowska Castle – Lesser Poland Voivodeship
 Dębno Castle – Lesser Poland Voivodeship
 Dobczyce Castle – Lesser Poland Voivodeship
 Drzewica Castle – Łódź Voivodeship
 Dybów Castle – Kuyavian-Pomeranian Voivodeship
 Działdowo – Warmian-Masurian Voivodeship
 Dzierzgoń Castle – Pomeranian Voivodeship
 Dzików Castle – Subcarpathian Voivodeship
 Dźwiniacz Dolny Castle – Subcarpathian Voivodeship

F 
 Fałków Castle – Świętokrzyskie Voivodeship
 Frombork Castle – Warmian-Masurian Voivodeship

G 
 Gdańsk, Wisłoujście Fortress – Pomeranian Voivodeship
 Giżycko, Boyen Fortress – Warmian-Masurian Voivodeship
 Gliwice Castle
 Głogów Castle – Lower Silesian Voivodeship
 Głogówek Castle – Opole Voivodeship
 Gniew Castle – Pomeranian Voivodeship
 Gola Dzierżoniowska Castle - Lower Silesian Voivodeship
 Golczewo Castle – West Pomeranian Voivodeship
 Golub-Dobrzyń Castle – Kuyavian-Pomeranian Voivodeship
 Gołańcz Castle – Greater Poland Voivodeship
 Gołuchów Castle – Greater Poland Voivodeship
 Gorzanów Castle - Lower Silesian Voivodeship
 Gorzkowice Castle – Łódź Voivodeship
  – Konin, Greater Poland Voivodeship
 Gostynin Castle – Masovian Voivodeship
 Gościszów Castle – Lesser Poland Voivodeship
 Góra Castle – Lower Silesian Voivodeship
 Graboszyce Castle – Lesser Poland Voivodeship
 Gradówek Castle – Lower Silesian Voivodeship
 Grodno Castle – Lower Silesian Voivodeship
 Gródek nad Dunajcem Castle – Lesser Poland Voivodeship
 Grodziec Castle – Lower Silesian Voivodeship
 Gryf Castle – Lower Silesian Voivodeship

H 
 Hoczew – Subcarpathian Voivodeship
 Homole – Lower Silesian Voivodeship
 Horodło – Lublin Voivodeship
 Hrubieszów – Lublin Voivodeship

I 
 Iłża – Masovian
 Inowłódz – Łódź Voivodeship
 Inowrocław – Kuyavian-Pomeranian Voivodeship

J 
 Janowiec – Lublin Voivodeship
 Jasna Góra – Silesian Voivodeship
 Jawor – Lower Silesian Voivodeship
 Jelcz-Laskowice – Lower Silesian Voivodeship
 Jurów – Lublin Voivodeship

K 
 Kamienna Góra – Lower Silesian Voivodeship
 Karpień Castle – Lower Silesian Voivodeship
 Karpniki – Lower Silesian Voivodeship
 Kazimierz Dolny – Lublin Voivodeship
 Kąty Wrocławskie – Lower Silesian Voivodeship
 Kędzierzyn-Koźle Castle – Opole Voivodeship
 Kętrzyn – Warmian-Masurian Voivodeship 
 Kliczków Castle – Lower Silesian Voivodeship
 Kliczków Mały – Łódź Voivodeship
 Kłaczyna – Lower Silesian Voivodeship
 Kłodzko, Kłodzko Fortress – Lower Silesian Voivodeship
 Kowal – Kuyavian-Pomeranian Voivodeship
 Koło – Greater Poland Voivodeship
 Kołobrzeg, Kołobrzeg Fortress – West Pomeranian Voivodeship
 Konary – Świętokrzyskie Voivodeship
 Korfantów Castle – Opole Voivodeship
 Korzkiew Castle – Lesser Poland Voivodeship 
 Koziegłowy – Silesian Voivodeship 
 Kożuchów – Lubusz Voivodeship 
 Koźmin Wielkopolski
 Kórnik Castle Greater Poland Voivodeship
 Kraków – Wawel Castle
 Krapkowice Castle – Opole Voivodeship
 Krasiczyn – Subcarpathian Voivodeship
 Krasnystaw – Lublin Voivodeship
 Krobielowice – Lower Silesian Voivodeship
 Krosno Odrzańskie – Lower Silesian Voivodeship
 Krupe Castle – Lublin Voivodeship
 Kryłów – Lublin Voivodeship
 Kruszwica – Kuyavian-Pomeranian Voivodeship
 Krzyżtopór – Świętokrzyskie Voivodeship
 Książ Castle –  Lower Silesian Voivodeship
 Kunowa – Subcarpathian Voivodeship
 Kurzętnik – Warmian-Masurian Voivodeship
 Kwidzyn Castle – Pomeranian Voivodeship

L 
 Lanckorona – Lesser Poland Voivodeship
 Legnica – Lower Silesian Voivodeship 
 Lesko – Subcarpathian Voivodeship
 Lidzbark Warmiński – Warmian-Masurian Voivodeship
 Lisów – Subcarpathian Voivodeship
 Liw Castle – Mazovian Voivodeship
 Lordship of Hummel – Lower Silesian Voivodeship
 Lubartów (d. Lewartów) – Lublin Voivodeship
 Lubin – Lower Silesian Voivodeship
 Lublin Castle – Lublin Voivodeship
 Lwówek Śląski – Lower Silesian Voivodeship

Ł 

 Łańcut Castle, Łańcut – Subcarpathian Voivodeship
 Łąka Prudnicka Castle – Opole Voivodeship
 Łęczyca Castle, Łęczyca – Łódź Voivodeship
 Łodygowice – Silesian Voivodeship
 Łownica – Świętokrzyskie Voivodeship

M 
 Machliny – West Pomeranian Voivodeship
 Malbork Castle – Pomeranian Voivodeship
 Malec – Lesser Poland Voivodeship
 Maleszowa – Świętokrzyskie Voivodeship
 Melsztyn – Lesser Poland Voivodeship
 Międzygórz – Holy Cross Voivodeship
 Międzyrzec
 Mirów – Silesian Voivodeship
 Modlin Fortress – Mazovian Voivodeship
 Modliszewice – Świętokrzyskie Voivodeship
 Moszna Castle – Opole Voivodeship
 Muszyna – Lesser Poland Voivodeship
 Myślenice – Lesser Poland Voivodeship

N 
 Namysłów – Opole Voivodeship
 Nidzica – Warmian-Masurian Voivodeship
 Niedzica Castle in Niedzica – Lesser Poland Voivodeship
 Niemcza – Lower Silesian Voivodeship
 Niemodlin – Opole Voivodeship
 Niepołomice – Lesser Poland Voivodeship
 Niesytno Castle – Lower Silesian Voivodeship
 Nowe nad Wisłą
 Nowy Korczyn – Holy Cross Voivodeship
 Nowy Sącz – Lesser Poland Voivodeship
 Nowy Wiśnicz – Lesser Poland Voivodeship
 Nysa Castle – Opole Voivodeship

O 
 Odrzykoń – Subcarpathian Voivodeship
 Ogrodzieniec Castle – Silesian Voivodeship
 Okartowo – Warmian-Masurian Voivodeship
 Ojców Castle – Lesser Poland Voivodeship
 Oleszyce – Subcarpathian Voivodeship
 Oleśnica Castle – Lower Silesian Voivodeship
 Olszanica – Subcarpathian Voivodeship
 Olsztyn Castle – Warmian-Masurian Voivodeship
 Olsztyn Castle – Silesian Voivodeship
 Oława Castle – Lower Silesian Voivodeship
 Opoczno – Łódź Voivodeship
 Opole – Opole Voivodeship
 Opole Lubelskie – Lublin Voivodeship
 Oporów – Łódź Voivodeship
 Orneta – Warmian-Masurian Voivodeship
 Osiek – Świętokrzyskie Voivodeship
 Ossolin – Świętokrzyskie Voivodeship
 Ostrorógu Castle in Greater Poland Voivodeship
 Ostrężnik – Silesian Voivodeship
 Oświęcim Castle – Lesser Poland Voivodeship
 Otyń – Lubusz Voivodeship
 Otmuchów Castle – Opole Voivodeship
 Owiesno – Lower Silesian Voivodeship

P 
 Papowo Biskupie – Warmian-Masurian Voivodeship
 Pasłęk – Warmian-Masurian Voivodeship
 Pęzino Castle – Pomeranian Voivodeship
 Piaseczno – Masovian Voivodeship
 Pieniężno – Warmian-Masurian Voivodeship
 Pieskowa Skała Castle – Lesser Poland Voivodeship
 Pilica – Silesian Voivodeship
 Pieszyce – Lower Silesian Voivodeship
 Piotrków Trybunalski - Łódź Voivodeship
 Płock – Mazovian Voivodeship
 Płonina – Lower Silesian Voivodeship
 Podskale – Lower Silesian Voivodeship
 Polska Cerekiew – Opole Voivodeship
 Pomeranian Dukes' Castle in Szczecin
 Poznań – Imperial Castle in Poznań
 Poznań – Royal Castle in Poznań
 Prudnik Castle – Opole Voivodeship
 Przecław – Subcarpathian Voivodeship
 Przegorzały – Lesser Poland Voivodeship
 Przewodziszowice – Silesian Voivodeship
 Przemyśl Castle – Subcarpathian Voivodeship
 Przezmark – Pomeranian Voivodeship
 Przyszów – Subcarpathian Voivodeship
 Pszczyna Castle – Silesian Voivodeship

R 
 Rabsztyn Castle – Lesser Poland Voivodeship
 Radków – Lower Silesian Voivodeship
 Radziki Duże – Kuyavian-Pomeranian Voivodeship
 Radzyń Chełmiński – Kuyavian-Pomeranian Voivodeship
 Radzyń Podlaski – Lublin Voivodeship
 Ratno Dolne – Lower Silesian Voivodeship
 Rawa Mazowiecka – Łódź Voivodeship
 Recz – West Pomeranian Voivodeship
 Resko – West Pomeranian Voivodeship
 Reszel – Warmian-Masurian Voivodeship
 Rembów – Świętokrzyskie Voivodeship
 Rogóźno-Zamek – Kuyavian-Pomeranian Voivodeship
 Rokitnica – Lower Silesian Voivodeship
 Rożnów – Lesser Poland Voivodeship
 Rudno (Tenczyn Castle) – Lesser Poland Voivodeship
 Rusiec – Łódź Voivodeship
 Rydzyna Castle, near Leszno – Greater Poland Voivodeship
 Rymanów – Subcarpathian Voivodeship
 Rytro –  Lesser Poland Voivodeship
 Rytwiany – Świętokrzyskie Voivodeship
 Rzeszów Castle – Subcarpathian Voivodeship

S 
 Sandomierz Castle – Świętokrzyskie Voivodeship
 Sanok Castle – Subcarpathian Voivodeship
 Sianów – West Pomeranian Voivodeship
 Sieraków – Greater Poland Voivodeship
 Siewierz – Silesian Voivodeship
 Siedlęcin – Lower Silesian Voivodeship
 Sielecki Castle
 Skępe – Kuyavian-Pomeranian Voivodeship
 Skierbieszów – Lublin Voivodeship
 Słupsk – Pomeranian Voivodeship
 Smolajny – Warmian-Masurian Voivodeship
 Smoleń – Silesian Voivodeship
 Sobień, – Subcarpathian Voivodeship
 Sobieszów (Chojnik) – Lower Silesian Voivodeship
 Sosnowiec – Silesian Voivodeship
 Spycimierz – Łódź Voivodeship
 Stary Dzierzgoń – Pomeranian Voivodeship
 Stołpie – Lublin Voivodeship
 Strzegom – Lower Silesian Voivodeship
 Strzygi – Kuyavian-Pomeranian Voivodeship
 Suchań – West Pomeranian Voivodeship
 Susiec – Lublin Voivodeship
 Syców – Lower Silesian Voivodeship
 Szaflary – Lesser Poland Voivodeship
 Szamotuły – Greater Poland Voivodeship
 Szestno – Warmian-Masurian Voivodeship
 Szczecin – West Pomeranian Voivodeship
 Szczecinek, - West Pomeranian Voivodship
 Szczytna – Lower Silesian Voivodeship
 Szprotawa – Lower Silesian Voivodeship
 Sztum – Pomeranian Voivodeship
 Szydłowiec – Mazovian Voivodeship
 Szydłów – Świętokrzyskie Voivodeship
 Szymbark – Lesser Poland Voivodeship

Ś 
 Ścinawa – Lower Silesian Voivodeship
 Ścinawka Średnia – Lower Silesian Voivodeship
 Świecie – Lower Silesian Voivodeship
 Świnoujście, Świnoujście Fortress – West Pomeranian Voivodeship
 Świny – Lower Silesian Voivodeship

T 
 Taczanów – Greater Poland Voivodeship
 Tarnobrzeg, Dzików – Subcarpathian Voivodeship
 Tarnów – Lesser Poland Voivodeship
 Tenczyn Castle – Lesser Poland Voivodeship
 Toruń: Teutonic Knights' Castle and Dybów Castle – Kuyavian-Pomeranian Voivodeship
 Tropsztyn Castle – Lesser Poland Voivodeship
 Trzebina Castle – Opole Voivodeship
 Tuczno Castle
 Tudorów – Świętokrzyskie Voivodeship
 Tuligłowy – Subcarpathian Voivodeship
 Tykocin Castle – Podlasie Voivodeship
 Tyszowce – Lublin Voivodeship

U 
 Udórz – Silesian Voivodeship
 Ujazd – Krzyżtopór Castle – Świętokrzyskie Voivodeship
 Uniejów – Łódź Voivodeship
 Uraz – Lower Silesian Voivodeship

W 
 Warta Bolesławiecka – Lower Silesian Voivodeship
 Wąbrzeźno – Kuyavian-Pomeranian Voivodeship
 Węgierka – Subcarpathian Voivodeship
 Wałcz – West Pomeranian Voivodeship
 Warsaw – Royal Castle
 Warsaw – Ujazdowski Castle
 Warsaw – Ostrogski Castle
 Wenecja Castle – Kuyavian-Pomeranian Voivodeship
 Wieliczka – Lesser Poland Voivodeship
 Wielka Wieś - Lesser Poland Voivodeship
 Wieruszyce – Lesser Poland Voivodeship
 Wierzchosławice – Lesser Poland Voivodeship
 Wiewiórka – Subcarpathian Voivodeship
 Witostowice – Lower Silesian Voivodeship
 Wleń – Lower Silesian Voivodeship
 Wojanów Lower Silesian Voivodeship
 Wojciechów – Lublin Voivodeship
 Wolibórz – Lower Silesian Voivodeship
 Wołczyn – Opole Voivodeship
 Wytrzyszczka – Lesser Poland Voivodeship

Z 
 Zabrzeż – Lesser Poland Voivodeship
 Zagórz – Subcarpathian Voivodeship
 Zagórze Śląskie (Grodno Castle) – Lower Silesian Voivodeship
 Załóż – Subcarpathian Voivodeship
 Zamek Bierzgłowski (Bierzgłowo Castle) – Kuyavian-Pomeranian Voivodeship
 Zamość – Lublin Voivodeship
 Zatoń – Lubusz Voivodeship
 Zator – Lesser Poland Voivodeship
 Zawada – Subcarpathian Voivodeship
 Zawichost – Świętokrzyskie Voivodeship
 Zawidów – Lower Silesian Voivodeship
 Zawiercie – Lesser Poland Voivodeship
 Ząbkowice Śląskie – Lower Silesian Voivodeship
 Zboiska – Subcarpathian Voivodeship
 Zgórsko – Podborze – Subcarpathian Voivodeship
 Ziębice – Lower Silesian Voivodeship
 Złocieniec – West Pomeranian Voivodeship
 Złotoria – Kuyavian-Pomeranian Voivodeship

Ż 
 Żałe – Kuyavian-Pomeranian Voivodeship
 Żagań – Lubusz Voivodeship
 Stary Żmigród – Subcarpathian Voivodeship
 Żmigród – Lower Silesian Voivodeship
 Żywiec – Silesian Voivodeship

References

 Castles in Poland
 Polish Castles
 Castles and Palaces of Poland
 Gallery of Polish Castles I
 Gallery of Polish Castles II
 Gothic Castles in Poland
 Castles of Poland
 Polish Castles
 Castles of Poland
 Stay in a castle during your visit to Poland 
 Photos of polish castles
 Castles in Poland
 Poland's Most Beautiful Castles [STORYMAP] 

 
Poland
Castles
Poland
Castles